Kelly Miller (born September 6, 1978) is an American former professional basketball player. She is the identical twin sister of fellow basketball player Coco Miller.

Early years
Born in Rochester, Minnesota, Kelly initially was interested in playing soccer and not basketball at high school, soon she joined her sister Coco. They also helped their school go 27–0 and win the Minnesota state's class 4A championship. Miller was named a WBCA All-American. She participated in the WBCA High School All-America Game where she scored thirteen points.

College years
The twins went to University of Georgia, where they both majored in biology and won a series of awards, including the James E. Sullivan Award, given to the nation's top amateur athlete. They earned that award in 1999, becoming the first pair of twins to earn the award, and joining Carl Lewis, Greg Louganis, Bill Walton, Bill Bradley, Kurt Thomas, Jackie Joyner-Kersee and Janet Evans as recipients of the award.

Kelly ranked second in points among University of Georgia women players with 2,177; second in assists with 639; fourth in steals with 379 and tenth in rebounds with 711. She is the only player in UGA women's basketball to rank among the top ten in points, assists, steals and rebounds. She became the third player in that university's history to pass over 2,000 points, and the third player in the Southeastern Conference's (SEC) history to garner "Player of the Week" awards three weeks in a row.

Georgia statistics
Source

USA Basketball

Miller played on the team presenting the US at the 1999 World University Games held in Palma de Mallorca, Spain. The team had a 4–2 record and earned the silver medal. Miller averaged 10.2 points per game.

WNBA career
In 2001 both Kelly and Coco both entered the WNBA Draft. Kelly was selected by the Charlotte Sting 2nd overall in the 1st round, where she averaged 4.6 points, 1.7 rebounds and 1.1 assists per game in her rookie year.

Kelly spent three seasons with the Sting as a utility player before she was traded to the Indiana Fever prior to the 2004 season.  It was with the Fever that Kelly finally became a first-string player on the team, starting on all 34 games she played in the 2004 season.

After the 2005 season ended, Kelly was traded to the Phoenix Mercury, in exchange for Anna DeForge.

On January 30, 2009, Miller was traded along with LaToya Pringle to the Minnesota Lynx for Nicole Ohlde.

WNBA career statistics

Regular season

|-
| align="left" | 2001
| align="left" | Charlotte
| 26 || 0 || 8.7 || .386 || .368 || .800 || 1.1 || 0.5 || 0.3 || 0.0 || 0.3 || 2.1
|-
| align="left" | 2002
| align="left" | Charlotte
| 32 || 0 || 17.3 || .446|| .471 || .763 || 2.1 || 1.5 || 0.7 || 0.0 || 0.8 || 6.6
|-
| align="left" | 2003
| align="left" | Charlotte
| 34 || 0 || 15.4 || .407 || .423 || .775 || 1.6 || 1.4 || 0.5 || 0.1 || 1.0 || 5.6
|-
| align="left" | 2004
| align="left" | Indiana
| 34 || 34 || 32.2 || .387 || .411 || .877 || 3.2 || 3.1 || 1.1 || 0.1 || 2.2 || 10.2
|-
| align="left" | 2005
| align="left" | Indiana
| 34 || 34 || 31.1 || .439 || .325 || .848 || 2.5 || 2.4 || 1.2 || 0.1 || 1.6 || 10.2
|-
| align="left" | 2006
| align="left" | Phoenix
| 27 || 24 || 30.1 || .421 || .380 || .774 || 5.3 || 3.5 || 1.0 || 0.2 || 2.7 || 11.0
|-
|style="text-align:left;background:#afe6ba;"|  2007†
| align="left" | Phoenix
| 34 || 34 || 30.6 || .479 || .386 || .780 || 4.9 || 4.6 || 1.2 || 0.1 || 2.5 || 9.4
|-
| align="left" | 2008
| align="left" | Phoenix
| 34 || 34 || 27.8 || .408 || .385 || .845 || 4.4 || 4.0 || 0.6 || 0.1 || 2.5 || 8.3
|-
| align="left" | 2009
| align="left" | Minnesota
| 34 || 25 || 19.9 || .362 || .333 || .909 || 2.2 || 2.0 || 0.7 || 0.1 || 1.5 || 4.4
|-
| align="left" | 2010
| align="left" | Atlanta
| 30 || 1 || 16.4 || .290 || .329 || .880 || 1.9 || 2.6 || 0.8 || 0.1 || 1.2 || 3.6
|-
| align="left" | 2011
| align="left" | Washington
| 34 || 29 || 27.7 || .382 || .441 || .789 || 2.3 || 2.8 || 0.7 || 0.2 || 1.8 || 7.4
|-
| align="left" | 2012
| align="left" | New York
| 11 || 0 || 7.5 || .167 || .091 || 1.000 || 0.7 || 0.5 || 0.3 || 0.0 || 0.8 || 1.0
|-
| align="left" | Career
| align="left" | 12 years, 7 teams
| 364 || 215 || 23.2 || .406 || .392 || .819 || 2.8 || 2.6 || 0.8 || 0.1 || 1.6 || 7.1

Playoffs

|-
| align="left" | 2001
| align="left" | Charlotte
| 2 || 0 || 4.0 || .000 || .000 || .000 || 0.0 || 0.0 || 0.0 || 0.0 || 0.0 || 0.0
|-
| align="left" | 2002
| align="left" | Charlotte
| 2 || 0 || 6.5 || .500 || 1.000 || .000 || 1.0 || 0.0 || 0.0 || 0.0 || 0.5 || 2.5
|-
| align="left" | 2003
| align="left" | Charlotte
| 2 || 0 || 11.5 || .400 || .000 || .000 || 0.5 || 1.0 || 0.0 || 0.0 || 0.5 || 4.0
|-
| align="left" | 2005
| align="left" | Indiana
| 4 || 4 || 38.8 || .308 || .529 || .700 || 1.8 || 2.5 || 1.3 || 0.0 || 1.3 || 10.0
|-
|style="text-align:left;background:#afe6ba;"|  2007†
| align="left" | Phoenix
| 9 || 9 || 33.0 || .455 || .308 || .818 || 5.3 || 3.6 || 1.3 || 0.1 || 2.0 || 11.7
|-
| align="left" | 2010
| align="left" | Atlanta
| 4 || 0 || 6.8 || .750 || .500 || 1.000 || 0.5 || 1.5 || 0.3 || 0.0 || 0.8 || 2.5
|-
| align="left" | Career
| align="left" | 6 years, 4 teams
| 23 || 13 || 22.7 || .412 || .396 || .771 || 2.6 || 2.2 || 0.8 || 0.0 || 1.2 || 7.3

NWBL career
After the 2002 WNBA season, both sisters played for the Birmingham Power of the National Women's Basketball League (NWBL).

International career
 2002–2003:  Fenerbahçe Istanbul (Turkey)
 2003–2004:  Fenerbahçe Istanbul (Turkey)
 2004–2005:  Chuncheon Woori Bank Hansae (WKBL, South Korea)
 2005–2006:  US Valenciennes Olympic (LFB, France)
 2006–2007:  Lattes-Maurin Montpellier (LFB, France)
 2007–2009:  Spartak Moscow Region (Russia)

Notes

External links
Kelly Miller's WNBA Profile page
WNBA Article and interview with both sisters
Mercury trade Miller/Pringle to the Lynx for Ohlde

1978 births
Living people
All-American college women's basketball players
American expatriate basketball people in France
American expatriate basketball people in Russia
American expatriate basketball people in South Korea
American expatriate basketball people in Turkey
American women's basketball players
Atlanta Dream players
Basketball players from Minnesota
Charlotte Sting players
Fenerbahçe women's basketball players
Georgia Lady Bulldogs basketball players
Identical twins
Indiana Fever players
James E. Sullivan Award recipients
Minnesota Lynx players
New York Liberty players
Parade High School All-Americans (girls' basketball)
Phoenix Mercury players
Point guards
Sportspeople from Rochester, Minnesota
American twins
Twin sportspeople
Universiade medalists in basketball
Universiade silver medalists for the United States
Washington Mystics players
Women's Korean Basketball League players